A sweet roll or sweet bun refers to any of a number of sweet, baked, yeast-leavened breakfast or dessert foods. They may contain spices, nuts, candied fruits, etc., and are often glazed or topped with icing. Compared to regular bread dough, sweet roll dough generally has higher levels of sugar, fat, eggs, and yeast. They are often round, and are small enough to comprise a single serving. These differ from pastries, which are made from a paste-like batter; from cakes, which are typically unleavened or chemically leavened; and from doughnuts, which are deep fried.

Refrigerated ready-to-bake sweet roll dough is commercially available in grocery stores.

Sweet rolls are sometimes iced and/or contain a sweet filling. In some traditions, other types of fillings and decoration are used, such as cinnamon, marzipan, or candied fruit.

See also
 List of sweet breads

References

Sweet breads